António José da Silva Botelho (born 8 May 1947 in Lisbon) is a retired Portuguese footballer who played as a goalkeeper.

References

External links

1947 births
Living people
Footballers from Lisbon
Portuguese footballers
Association football goalkeepers
Primeira Liga players
Liga Portugal 2 players
Atlético Clube de Portugal players
Sporting CP footballers
Boavista F.C. players
S.L. Benfica footballers
Amora F.C. players
A.D. Sanjoanense players
Seixal F.C. players
Portugal international footballers